Setovia was an Illyrian fortified settlement of the Delmatae.

It was located at an unknown location in the modern-day Sinjsko polje, and was besieged by Octavian's Roman troops in 34–33 BC. Some Roman stone inscriptions were found near Vrlika and Kijevo that indicate Setovia was nearby.

See also 
List of ancient cities in Illyria

References

External links

Former populated places in the Balkans
Cities in ancient Illyria
Illyrian Croatia